The Karan or Karana is a community of scribes found in the state of Odisha in India. The post of Karana used to be a professional designation that was occupied by literate members of the lower as well as the higher castes. They also held Karanam post in some parts of Andhra Pradesh, where they speak Odia and played the similar role in Odisha as that of the Kayasthas of West Bengal and Bihar. Traditionally they were the official record-keepers in the royal courts of the Odia princely states historically (Orissa Tributary States). Today they are a politically dominant community and have reigned over the politics of Odisha for 40 years.

History

Hindu Scriptures 
Various Hindu scriptures such as Smrtis and Puranas mention Karan as a mixed caste. According to puranic accounts, the offspring of a Vaishya father and a Shudra mother is called a Karan, which places them below Vaishyas & above Shudras as per Manu's law. Amarkosha mentioned Karan along with Ambastha & Chandalas as mixed castes. Coolbrooke also supports the mixed origin of Karan mentioned above.

Mediaeval Period
The frequent admission of land grants to princes, Brahmins and various officials gave rise to a new new class of scribes. They were recruited from lower as well as higher castes. However the Karanas crystallized into a distinct caste only in the 10th or 11th century AD owing to social mobility. Any mention of the term prior to that period simply denotes its functional aspect rather than a caste affiliation.

Social Status
The Karanas are a forward caste of Odisha. In mediaeval Odisha, Karanas climbed the social ladder by supplying brides to the ruling dynasties. An example of this can be found in the Arasavali copper plate of the Eastern Ganga monarch Vajrahasta III. During the British colonial era, many Karanas of Odisha had received zamindaris. In recent post-Independence era India, they have also played a dominant role in politics. Such is their prominence in politics that many members from the Karan community have been elected as the Chief Ministers of Odisha, hence they are also dubbed as the political caste of Odisha.

Surnames
Prominent surnames of the Karan community include Patnaik, Mohanty, Das etc.

Notable people
 Biju Patnaik
 Janaki Ballabh Patnaik
 Naveen Patnaik
 Nabakrushna Choudhury

References

Social groups of Odisha